Iolo Tudur Williams (born 22 August 1962) is a Welsh ornithologist, nature observer, television presenter and author, best known for his BBC and S4C nature programmes, working in both English and his first language of Welsh. After a 14-year career with the RSPB, in 1999 Williams became a full-time TV presenter. He has written a number of books about the natural world.

Biography
Williams was born in Builth Wells, Breconshire, but his family moved to Pembrokeshire, before moving to Montgomeryshire, when he was aged five, to live in Llanwddyn near Lake Vyrnwy. Educated at Llanfyllin High School, after gaining two A-Levels in Biology and French, he almost joined the British Army but instead went to the North East London Polytechnic (now the University of East London), graduating with a degree in Ecology.

Career
After graduation, Williams worked on a farm and then in the timber trade, before joining the Royal Society for the Protection of Birds (RSPB) in 1985, staying for 14 years working in the field and as a regional co-ordinator. This led to his making regular appearances in the media, making a name for himself as a leading expert on Welsh bird life.

In 1997 he made Visions of Snowdonia with BBC Wales, which followed the lives of six people living and working on the slopes of the country's highest mountain. After making a second series, in 1999 Williams decided to leave the RSPB and pursue a full-time career in the media.

In 2007 he presented Canals of Wales with Iolo Williams, a five-part series looking at the canals of Wales. In 2008 he presented another series focusing on the Welsh landscape, Iolo's Natural History of Wales.

Williams presented Rugged Wales, which aired on BBC Two on 13 and 20 March 2012. In 2013 he presented Iolo's Great Welsh Parks, and in 2015 he presented a second series of the programme. He continued to present series for the BBC which focused on his native Wales, presenting The Brecon Beacons in 2016, then a third series on great Welsh parks. He continued to showcase Welsh wildlife by presenting Iolo's Snowdonia in 2018. The same year saw him travel to Australia to film Wonders of the Great Barrier Reef.

In 2019 Williams became a regular presenter on Winterwatch, Springwatch and Autumnwatch on BBC Two. In 2020 he presented Iolo: The Last Wilderness of Wales, about the wildlife of the Cambrian Mountains. In 2021 he presented a four-part personal view of the natural world of Pembrokeshire in Iolo's Pembrokeshire.

Awards
In 2007 Williams was awarded an honorary fellowship of Bangor University. He received further honorary fellowships from Aberystwyth University in 2015 and the University of South Wales in 2017.

Personal life
Williams and his wife Ceri live near the town of Newtown, Powys. The couple have two sons (Dewi and Tomos); and had two rescue dogs, Ianto and Gwen, who have both appeared in some of his television series.

Known for frequently wearing shorts for his work, he has, as a result, become a Welsh cult gay icon.

Williams and his wife have built a fully-insulated timber-framed home. They have a wildlife garden, and grow their own vegetables. They compost all their food waste, and recycle everything else, whilst always eating organic and local produce. As a result of this, in a 2011 World Wide Fund for Nature survey of carbon footprints of ecology personalities, Williams and his family were found to have a low rating of 1.81, compared to a Welsh average of 3.0.

Williams offered his support to a Welsh independence march in 2022.

Filmography

Television

Natur Gudd Cymru (S4C)
Bro (S4C)
Iolo yn Rwsia (S4C)
Gwyllt (S4C)
Natur Anghyfreithlon (S4C)
Crwydro (S4C)
Iolo's Special Reserves 2003 (BBC)
Canals of Wales 2007 (BBC)
 Wild Wales 2009 (BBC)
Secret Life of Birds 2010 (BBC)
Wild Winter (BBC)
Iolo's Welsh Safari 2005 (BBC)
Iolo's Natural History of Wales 2008 (BBC)
Iolo ac Indiaid America 2010 (S4C)
Springwatch 2010-2022 (BBC)
Rugged Wales 2012 (BBC)
Iolo's Great Welsh Parks 2013 (BBC)
Iolo's Snowdonia 2018 (BBC)
Wonders of the Great Barrier Reef with Iolo Williams 2018 (S4C & BBC)
Winterwatch 2019-2022 (BBC)
Hydref Gwyllt Iolo 2020 (S4C)
The Last Wilderness of Wales 2020 (BBC)
Iolo's Pembrokeshire 2021 (BBC)
Iolo's Anglesey 2022 (BBC)
Iolo: A Wild Life 2022 (BBC)

Written works
Blwyddyn Iolo, Gwasg Gwynedd, 2003
Crwydro, Hughes a'i Fab, 2004 
Wild about the Wild, Gwasg Gomer, 2005

 Wild Places Wales, Seren, 2016
 Wild Places UK, Seren, 2019

References

Sources
Llyfr Natur Iolo by Paul Sterry – Gwasg Carreg Gwalch, 2007

External links
 
 

1962 births
Living people
Welsh-language television presenters
People from Builth Wells
Royal Society for the Protection of Birds people
British ornithologists
British conservationists
Welsh environmentalists
Welsh television presenters
People associated with Bangor University
Welsh zoologists
Alumni of the University of East London